Henry Bisset (died 1208), Lord of Kidderminster, was an English noble. He served as dapifer, or steward, to King John of England.

Life 
He was the only known son of Manasser Biset and Alice de Falaise. At his father's death in 1177, Henry was still under age and placed under the care of a relative.

During 1202, Henry is referred to as the dapifer. He was patron to the hospital that his father Manassar built for leper women at Bradley, Wiltshire (later Maiden Bradley). He owned the manor of Shamblehurst in Hampshire. Henry died in 1208.

Marriage and issue
He married Albreda FitzRichard. They had the following known issue:
William Bisset (died 1220), married Sarah de Huntingfield, without issue; was succeeded by his brother John
John Bisset, married Alice Basset, had issue
Margaret Bisset, married Roger la Zouche, had issue
Secondly he married Iseult, daughter of William Pantulf and Joan de Goldington.

Citations

References

 

Year of birth uncertain
12th-century births
1208 deaths